Abdoulaye Diallo (born 15 January 1996) is a Senegalese football player who plays for Hong Linh Ha Tinh FC.

Club career
He made his professional debut in the Segunda Liga for Desportivo Aves on 17 February 2016 in a game against S.L. Benfica.

References

External links
 
 

1996 births
Living people
Senegalese footballers
Association football forwards
Senegalese expatriate footballers
Expatriate footballers in Portugal
Expatriate footballers in Belarus
Expatriate footballers in Russia
Senegalese expatriate sportspeople in Portugal
Senegalese expatriate sportspeople in Belarus
Senegalese expatriate sportspeople in Russia
Primeira Liga players
Liga Portugal 2 players
Campeonato de Portugal (league) players
Belarusian Premier League players
Russian First League players
AD Oeiras players
C.D. Aves players
Real S.C. players
FC Rukh Brest players
FC Dynamo Brest players
FC Orenburg players